The Allegra 24 is an American trailerable sailboat that was designed by Fred Bingham and Lou Nagy and based upon the work of Fred Bingham's son, Bruce Bingham. The boat is intended as  a cruiser and was first built in 1984.

The Allegra 24 is a development of the smaller, Bruce Bingham-designed Flicka 20.

Production
The design was built by a number of companies, including Matrix Marine/Wilmette Boat Works from fiberglass and also by Mestiza Yachts from wood, in the United States starting in 1984, but it is now out of production. Boats were built on a custom basis, to order and some were delivered as kits or as bare hulls for owner completion.

Design

The Allegra 24 is a recreational keelboat, built predominantly of biaxial glass/acrylic-epoxy resin pre-preg fiberglass, with PVC foam-cored decks and cabin tops, with wood trim. Some were also built from wood. It has a cutter rig, a spooned plumb stem, an angled transom, a keel-mounted rudder controlled by a tiller and a fixed long keel, with a cutaway forefoot. It displaces  and carries  of ballast.

The boat may be fitted with an inboard motor or an outboard motor of under  for docking and maneuvering. The outboard motor is mounted on an off-center transom bracket, to de-conflict with the rudder. The fuel tank holds .

The interior layout varies, but typical includes sleeping accommodation for four people, with a double "V"-berth in the bow cabin and two straight settees in the main cabin, with an extendable table. The galley is located on the starboard side just forward of the companionway ladder. The galley is equipped with a two-burner stove and a sink. The head is located opposite the galley on the port side.

For sailing the design is equipped with a jib and a genoa. The mainsheet is mid-cockpit.

Operational history
In a 2010 review Steve Henkel described the boat's "best features: The cutter rig, with the staysail on a boom and the jib on a roller furler, help to make the boat an easy singlehander. Worst features: Relative to her comp[petitor]s, the Allegra is a lighter, less beamy boat, better in the lighter air along coastal waters but perhaps not as satisfactory offshore when the going gets rough."

A Blue Water Boats review noted, "under sail the Allegra 24 leaves all comparisons to the Flicka 20 behind. She's a fast boat, one of the fastest pocket cruisers in her class capable of exceeding hull speed quite easily and is a particularly strong performer in light winds. Next to the Flicka, she points higher, is nimble through the tacks, and is much better slicing through chop. Her bow flare and higher freeboard makes for a much drier ride and in following seas where the Flicka tends to squat in need of more stern buoyancy, the Allegra lifts well. A quick glance at her numbers reveal three feet more waterline length, 50% more sail area, despite a displacement that's in the same ballpark as the Flicka."

See also
List of sailing boat types

Related development
Flicka 20

References

Keelboats
1980s sailboat type designs
Sailing yachts
Trailer sailers
Sailboat type designs by Bruce Bingham
Sailboat types built by Matrix Marine
Sailboat types built by Wilmette Boat Works
Sailboat types built by Mestiza Yachts